Moračnik is an island in Lake Skadar in the Montenegrin municipality of Bar.

Monastery 

The Moračnik Monastery is a Serbian Orthodox monastery built on the Moračnik island on the Skadar Lake, modern-day Montenegro. The monastery was first mentioned in 1417 in the chapter issued by Balša III.

References 

Islands of Montenegro
Bar, Montenegro